Beta Theta Pi, commonly known as Beta, is a North American social fraternity that was founded in 1839 at Miami University in Oxford, Ohio. One of North America's oldest fraternities, as of 2022 it consists of 144 active chapters in the United States and Canada. More than 219,000 members have been initiated worldwide and there are currently around 8,500 undergraduate members. Beta Theta Pi is the oldest of the three fraternities that formed the Miami Triad, along with Phi Delta Theta and Sigma Chi.

History

Students at Miami University at the time of Beta's founding had previously formed two rival literary societies: The Erodelphian and Union Literary Society. A student of the school, John Reily Knox, began to gather members of both the Erodelphian and Union Literary Societies with the goal of creating a new fraternity. In a letter that he wrote four years after the founding of the Alpha chapter, Knox said that other fraternities being formed possessed "many objectionable features which rendered them liable to be used as engines of evil as well as instruments of good."

The fraternity was formally founded on August 8, 1839, by eight male students of Miami University.

Purpose
The five core values espoused by Beta Theta Pi are cultivation of intellect, responsible conduct, mutual assistance, integrity and trust. These are the underpinnings for their mission statement to "develop men of principle for a principled life." In 1879, Beta Theta Pi became the first college fraternity to publish its constitution. The fraternity continues to guard certain secrets about membership. Similar to other fraternities, Beta Theta Pi's code emphasizes international fellowship, cultural development and cooperation .

Men of Principle initiative
In August 1996, St. Lawrence University Chairman and Beta Theta Pi alumnus E.B. Wilson wrote a letter to the editor of The Beta Theta Pi magazine challenging the general fraternity to undertake a project to reverse the emerging Greek and Beta culture, which he felt was not in line with their core values.

In response to Wilson and a number of institutional difficulties, the Men of Principle initiative was started during the 1998–99 academic year. Three chapters, Nebraska, Georgia and Pennsylvania, were used as pilot chapters for the new program. After this first year of piloting, the Men of Principle initiative was officially introduced at the 160th General Convention in Oxford, in 1999.

According to the fraternity, before Men of Principle, the Fraternity's average chapter GPA was just above a 2.8. In 2019, the fraternity's GPA rose to 3.251 – an all-time high. The average chapter size in 2019 was 72 men, compared to 48.9 in 1997. In 1997, there was an average of two advisors per chapter, while as of 2019 there was an average of seven advisors working with each one of the chapters. Beta received some backlash for the initiative. Between the beginning of the program in 1998 and 2013, its international headquarters closed 85 chapters for failing to comply with the Men of Principle initiative.

As part of the Men of Principle initiative, Beta runs several leadership programs for undergraduate members and alumni. As of 2019, approximately 25,000 members graduated from one of the fraternity's leadership programs.

The Founding of Beta Theta Pi
At nine o’clock on the evening of the eighth day of the eighth month of the year 1839, eight earnest young men, all students at Miami University, held the first meeting of Beta Theta Pi in the Hall of the Union Literary Society, an upper room in the old college building (known as “Old Main”). The eight founders in the order in which their names appear in the minutes were:
John Reily Knox 1839,
Samuel Taylor Marshall 1840,
David Linton 1839,
James George Smith 1840,
Charles Henry Hardin 1841,
John Holt Duncan 1840,
Michael Clarkson Ryan 1839,
Thomas Boston Gordon 1840,
"of ever honored memory"

Local chapter or member misconduct
As part of a multi-year dispute over co-ed student housing issues, the Beta Theta Pi chapter at Wesleyan University had been refusing access to campus security personnel. In March 2010, Wesleyan issued a warning to students to avoid the chapter house. In October of that year a freshman was raped by a non-member, non-student at a Beta Theta Pi Halloween party. The rapist was arrested, and both the fraternity and the university reached an out-of-court settlement with the victim in 2014. The dispute over campus housing was later resolved.

In 2012, a lawsuit by a female student at Wesleyan University accused the university's chapter of sexual assault and called its fraternity house a "rape factory" due to the predatory practices present and constant sexual assaults of young women visiting the house.

In March 2013, the Carnegie Mellon University chapter was suspended following a police investigation of sexually explicit videos and photographs of female students circulating among members.

In February 2014, the fraternity's Alpha chapter at Miami University was closed in response to alcohol and hazing incidents. The Alpha chapter was refounded in 2017, and in the year 2018, the chapter celebrated the 100-year anniversary of the fraternity house, a $5 million renovation that brought the house into the 21st Century.

In 2017, the Pennsylvania State University chapter was permanently disbanded due to the death of a pledge, Tim Piazza, related to hazing and alcohol abuse. Eighteen members of the fraternity were arrested and charged for his wrongful death. The former chapter faces more than 147 charges, including involuntary manslaughter.

See also
 List of Beta Theta Pi chapters
 List of Beta Theta Pi members
 List of social fraternities and sororities

References

Sources
 Brown, James T., ed., Catalogue of Beta Theta Pi, New York: 1917.

External links

 
1839 establishments in Ohio
Miami University
North American Interfraternity Conference
Student organizations established in 1839
Student societies in the United States